Nassagaweya Township is a geographic township and former municipality now part of Milton.

The township was created in 1819, its name derived from the Mississauga word nazhesahgewayyong, meaning 'river with two outlets.'  This refers to the fact that watercourses in the township drain to both Lake Ontario and the Grand River system.

Nassagaweya township became part of the Town of Milton in 1974.

Communities within the boundaries of the former township include:  Campbellville, Brookville, Moffat, Haltonville, Darbyville, Guelph Junction and Sayers Mills.  Nassagaweya historically contained Eden Mills and borders on Kilbride.

The heritage house Nassagaweya in Brisbane, Australia was named after the township being the birthplace of the house's owner John Gillies.

Organization of schools

By 1862, there were six schools in the township:

 In Concession 3, at lots 4, 10, 15 and 29
 In Concession 4, at lot 22
 In Concession 7, at lot 25

Attractions 
 Halton County Radial Railway
 Mohawk Raceway
 Mountsberg Conservation Area
 Crawford Lake Conservation Area
 Hilton Falls Conservation Area

See also
List of townships in Ontario

References

External links
Escarpment Country Tourism
North Halton Compass Newspaper

Former municipalities in Ontario
Geography of the Regional Municipality of Halton
History of the Regional Municipality of Halton
Geographic townships in Ontario
Former townships in Ontario
Populated places disestablished in 1974